A writers' room is a space where writers, usually of a television series, gather to write and refine scripts. 

The television industry has long had a collaborative model for writing shows. Historically the rooms were physical spaces.  Increasingly these collaborations are done through zoom.  With the explosion of scripted shows, and the competition among the networks and streaming channels, a "fluidity has developed to the way shows are created." The writers' room follows no single formula; it is an open-ended process with a range of set-ups.  Room sizes vary from two to thirty, depending on the budget and number of episodes, each room with its own rules.  "Mini-rooms" exist for limited series and smaller shows, mostly those haven't gotten the thumbs-up.

Room hierarchy/pecking order
The showrunner runs the entire writers' room. They have overall responsibility for the entire series; they are in charge of the budget, scripts, crew, keeping actors happy and interacting with the studio or network.  They are usually writers themselves and are generally listed as executive producers.
 
Executive producer is a writer and second in charge and may act on behalf of the showrunner.

Producers are writers who have moved up the room hierarchy. This group includes co-executive producers, supervisory producers, co-producers and line producer. They are involved in script approvals, casting, production and creative direction. A line producer is a managerial position, and often not a writer.

Executive story editor is a mid-level tv writer running groups of staff writers.
Staff writer is an entry level writing position, reserved for someone working on their first or second scripts.

A writers' assistant is one of the most coveted jobs in the industry. The assistant takes notes in the room and interacts with the writers and creators. They learn the business from the inside and make contacts, hoping to be able to later move up the  hierarchy. It is their job to make sure that no good ideas are lost, do research, produce web material and occasionally make creative pitches.

Production assistant is an entry level job, also hard to get. They run errands, make copies, get coffee and are described as the "legs" of the industry.

Writers as producers

The room does more than write; they cast, hire key crew, work on set design, and anything else a producer would do.  A main writer of an episode will get credit as the writer.  A producer credit for a series will generally be given to each member of the writing staff who made a demonstrable contribution to the final script. The pecking order determines the level of the credit. The actual producer of the show (in the traditional sense) is listed under the credit "produced by". Bill Lawrence, a television screenwriter, stated that:

Notable writers rooms

I Love Lucy with Madelyn Pugh Bob Carroll, Jr., Bob Schiller and Bob Weiskopf
Your Show of Shows with Mel Brooks, Carl Reiner, Howard Morris, Woody Allen, Tony Webster, Lucille Kallen, Selma Diamond, Danny Simon, Mel Tolkin, Max Liebman, Sid Caeser and Neil Simon. Five years after the Holocaust and in the midst of the Blacklist (which frequently targeted Jewish writers) it has been noted that they were all were Jewish except for Webster.
The Smothers Brothers Comedy Hour with Steve Martin, Rob Reiner, Pat Paulsen, Tony Webster and Bob Einstein
The Dana Carvey Show with Steve Carell, Louis C.K., Stephen Colbert, Robert Smigel, Robert Carlock, Jon Glaser, Dino Stamatopoulos and Dana Carvey

References

Television terminology
Screenwriting